A Herb Alpert and the Tijuana Brass Double Feature is a 1966 animated short film featuring two songs from the Herb Alpert and the Tijuana Brass album Going Places. The film won the Academy Award for Best Animated Short Film in 1967. It was written and directed by John and Faith Hubley, who had previously won for Moonbird and The Hole. It is considered to be an early prototypical example of a music video, and has not been released onto home media.

Production
The film was distributed by Paramount Pictures. Emery Hawkins and Rod Scribner were among the animators who worked on the film.

Film summary
"Spanish Flea" and "Tijuana Taxi" are soundtracks to two separate cartoons. In "Spanish Flea", a flea bothers various animals until it is chased away from them by a group of men. In "Tijuana Taxi", a rickety and old purple taxi in Tijuana picks up a disproportionate number of people who have to catch a plane at the local airport. After a crazy ride through the streets of Tijuana (including a short visit to a bullfighting arena), the taxi driver is delayed by a customs officer, who takes a long time in stamping the passports for the driver's numerous customers, and he misses the plane. However, he makes up for it by having his taxi fly away. 

The music used to introduce the film during its opening credits is the band's "The Mexican Shuffle."

Film preservation
The Academy Film Archive preserved A Herb Alpert and the Tijuana Brass Double Feature in 2003.

References

External links

1966 films
1966 animated films
1960s animated short films
Animated films without speech
Best Animated Short Academy Award winners
Films directed by John Hubley
Music videos
Paramount Pictures short films